John Murice Jackson (born June 1, 1950) is an American actor, best known for playing Rear Admiral A. J. Chegwidden on the CBS series JAG and also as a special guest star on its spinoff NCIS and recurring cast to its spinoff NCIS: Los Angeles.

John was forced to use his middle initial "M." for his professional name because there was already a "John Jackson" registered with the Screen Actors Guild when he joined the union and SAG rules prohibit two or more members from using exactly the same name.

Early life
Jackson was born in Baton Rouge, Louisiana, and raised in Fort Worth, Texas. He played football and basketball at Arlington Heights High School in Fort Worth, graduating in 1968. After graduating from the University of Texas at Austin, Jackson taught social studies at LBJ High School in Austin, Texas.

Career
Jackson started acting in his late 20s, at a community theater. In 1980, Jackson went to New York City, and later to Hollywood, to further his acting career. He had small roles in a number of television and motion picture productions, most notably a recurring role in the series Wiseguy. In 1986, he appeared in the TV film Blind Justice, starring Tim Matheson.  In 1987, Jackson  had a small role in the MacGyver episode "Birth Day" as LA police sergeant Meechum who recognizes MacGyver's flag help signal, saying he does so because he spent four years in the Navy. In 1992, Jackson played Captain West, a senior JAG officer, in the American drama film A Few Good Men.

In 1996, Jackson took on the role of Rear Admiral A. J. Chegwidden (the Judge Advocate General of the Navy) in JAG, which he would continue to play for nine consecutive years. Jackson was Johnny B./Eli Ferguson in The Spitfire Grill.  His mother was played by Ellen Burstyn.

Jackson had a recurring role as FBI Deputy Director Sam Cullen in the first season of Fox series Bones. Jackson appeared in the series finale of Jericho as the ambassador of Texas to the Allied States of America. Jackson portrayed C-130 pilot Gus in the NBC series Knight Rider and has recently appeared on CSI: Crime Scene Investigation.

Jackson returned to the role of retired admiral A.J. Chegwidden, now a civilian lawyer, in the NCIS season 10 finale, broadcast on May 14, 2013 and again as a recurring character on NCIS: Los Angeles in its 8th and 9th seasons.

Personal life
Jackson is married to Jana Gale Hawkins Jackson. They have a son, former Major League Baseball player Conor Jackson, and a daughter, Katherine.

Filmography

Film

Television

References

External links
 

1950 births
American male film actors
American male television actors
20th-century American male actors
21st-century American male actors
Living people
Players of American football from Baton Rouge, Louisiana
Male actors from Austin, Texas
Male actors from Baton Rouge, Louisiana
Texas Longhorns football players
Players of American football from Texas